The Man on Lincoln's Nose is a 2000 American short documentary film directed by Daniel Raim about Hollywood art director Robert F. Boyle.  It was nominated for an Academy Award for Best Documentary Short. The title is derived from the Alfred Hitchcock film North by Northwest (1959), which has a climactic scene of two characters dangling from the carving of Abraham Lincoln's face on Mount Rushmore. One of the producers was Hitchcock's daughter, Patricia Hitchcock.

Cast
 James D. Bissell as himself
 Robert F. Boyle as himself
 Henry Bumstead as himself
 Norman Jewison as himself
 Harold Michelson as himself
 Walter Mirisch as himself
 Albert Nozaki as himself

Awards and nominations

See also
 List of documentary films
 List of American films of 2000

References

External links

The Man on Lincoln's Nose at Adama Films

2000 films
2000 short documentary films
American short documentary films
American independent films
Documentary films about Hollywood, Los Angeles
2000 independent films
Scenic design
2000s English-language films
2000s American films